The Oracle Residences Titans was a basketball team playing in the Philippine Basketball League and is owned by Mikee Romero.

Current roster

Notable players and coaches
 Marcy Arellano 
 Jason Ballesteros
 Paolo Bugia
 Mark Cardona
 Gabby Espinas
 JC Intal
 Chico Lanete
 Solomon Mercado
 Derrick Pumaren (consultant)
 Dindo Pumaren (coach; predecessor of Jorge Gallent)
 Rob Reyes
 LA Tenorio
 Joseph Yeo
 Tonichi Ytturi (coach and team manager)
 Tyrone Tang
 Jayson Castro
 Boyet Bautista
 Al Vergara
 Jorge Gallent (coach, 2004–2009)
 Josh Urbiztondo

Finals Most Valuable Players

Harbour Centre's championship would not be possible if not for some key players that stepped up when they are needed the most.

LA Tenorio
- Tenorio played for Harbour during the 2006 championship where they were the lowest seed to win a championship. He led Batang Pier along with La Salle Standout Joseph Yeo against Toyota Otis. 

Chico Lanete
- Chico a Lyceum star showcased his talent when he led Harbour to their 2nd and 3rd crown. A proven scorer he led Batang Pier into sweeping their opponents in the Finals to a very easy win. He is a back to back Finals MVP

TY Tang
- Tang after leading La Salle to a championship just wanted more. As he led Harbour against the undefeated Happee  led by Gabe Norwood. After being behind 19 points he put the game to overtime
then made 2 key treys that gave them probably the hardest and sweetest championship their fourth
title. 

Jayson Castro
- Jayson Castro the 3 time PBL MVP scored  30 points as they once again defeated Hapee led by Norwood. Castro used his quick speed as he mocked all the guards thrown at him. He had an unstoppable performance all series long. 

Mark Barocca
- Mark Barocca despite being a rookie this FEU star cannot be underestimated. Barocca despite a bad first half, exploded in the 4th quarter as he scored in Harbour's run. Barocca is the last Finals MVP of Harbour Centre before changing the franchise name to Oracle Residences.

Chris Timberlake
- Chris Timberlake led Oracle to their seventh straight title and their last, Timberlake is the last Finals MVP for Harbour Centre/ Oracle franchise.

External links
Oracle Residences website
Oracle Residences Titans PBL website

Former Philippine Basketball League teams